Sardar Abdul Hamid Khan Dasti (Urdu: عبدالحمید خان دستی) was a Pakistani politician who served as the Chief Minister of Punjab in 1955. He was an MP in the Second Parliament of Pakistan.

Family and personal life
Abdul Hamid Dasti was born in Muzaffargarh in 1895, the second of seven sons of Allah Yaar Khan Dasti. He and his wife, Amatullah, would go on to have three sons, two daughters, and 13 grandchildren, some of which would follow in his footsteps to serve their country in the political realm.

Death
Abdul Hamid Kahn Dasti died on 11 February 1985.

References

|-

|-

1895 births
1985 deaths
Chief Ministers of Punjab, Pakistan
Year of death missing
Punjab, Pakistan MLAs 1951–1955
Muzaffargarh
People from Muzaffargarh District
People from Muzaffargarh
Politicians from Muzaffargarh